The 1955 Latin Cup was the sixth edition of the annual Latin Cup which was played by clubs of the Southwest European nations of France, Italy, Portugal, and Spain. The tournament was hosted by France, and the Spanish club Real Madrid CF was the winner of the tournament after defeating Stade de Reims by a score of 2–0 in the final match.

Participating teams

Venues 

The host of the tournament was France, and all matches were played in one host stadium.

Tournament

Bracket

Semifinals

Third place match

Final

Goalscorers

See also 

 1955 Mitropa Cup, a similar competition

Notes

References

External links 

 Latin Cup (Full Results) from RSSSF

Latin Cup
International association football competitions hosted by France
June 1955 sports events in Europe